The  is a Japanese third-sector railway company established in 2012 to operate passenger railway services on the section of the JR West Hokuriku Main Line within Ishikawa Prefecture. The company was founded on 28 August 2012 and has its headquarters in Kanazawa, Ishikawa.

Shareholders
Shares in the company are owned by Ishikawa Prefecture, the city of Kanazawa, the town of Tsubata, and private-sector businesses.

IR Ishikawa Railway Line

Service outline
Noto Kagaribi (Kanazawa - ) and Thunderbird ( - Wakura-Onsen) limited express services also operate over the section of the line between Kanazawa and Tsubata, with some services calling at Tsubata.

Stations

Rolling stock
The company operates a fleet of five two-car 521 series EMU trains; three second-batch sets (10, 14, and 30) were transferred from JR West, and two third-batch sets (55 and 56) were newly built. The two new sets were initially delivered in February 2015 in standard JR West livery but were repainted into the IR Ishikawa Railway livery before entering service. Trains are normally operated as two- or four-car formations.

, the 521 series fleet is as follows.

History
The line eastward from Kanazawa was opened on 1 November 1898 on the Hokuriku Main Line. With the privatization of JNR on 1 April 1987, the line came under the control of JR West.

The new third-sector operating company was founded on 28 August 2012 and was renamed IR Ishikawa Railway from 1 August 2013. The company was formally granted a railway operating license by the Ministry of Land, Infrastructure, Transport and Tourism on 28 February 2014.

See also
List of railway companies in Japan
List of railway lines in Japan

References

External links

  

Railway companies of Japan
Companies based in Ishikawa Prefecture
Japanese companies established in 2012
Railway lines opened in 1898
1067 mm gauge railways in Japan
Japanese third-sector railway lines